Turtle Lake Lodge is a former organized hamlet of the Rural Municipality of Parkdale No. 498 that is now part of the Resort Village of Turtle View in Saskatchewan, Canada.

History 
Turtle Lake Lodge amalgamated with the nearby Organized Hamlet of Indian Point – Golden Sands on January 1, 2020 to form the Resort Village of Turtle View.

References 

Former organized hamlets in Saskatchewan
Parkdale No. 498, Saskatchewan
Division No. 17, Saskatchewan